The Stade Gaston Peyrille is a stadium primarily used for football matches in Bitam, Gabon. It is the home of the Gabonese team US Bitam of the Gabon Championnat National D1. The stadium has capacity of 7,000 spectators.

External links
Venue information

Gaston Peyrille